"A Foggy Day" is a popular song composed by George Gershwin, with lyrics by Ira Gershwin.  The song was  introduced by Fred Astaire in the 1937 film A Damsel in Distress. It was originally titled "A Foggy Day (In London Town)" in reference to the pollution-induced pea soup fogs that were common in London during that period, and is often still referred to by the full title.
  The commercial recording by Astaire for Brunswick was very popular in 1937.

Other recordings
 Frank Sinatra – Songs for Young Lovers (1953)
Ella Fitzgerald on her Ella Fitzgerald Sings the George and Ira Gershwin Song Book from Verve Records, 1959.
 Charles Mingus – Pithecanthropus Erectus (1956)
 Louis Armstrong with Ella Fitzgerald – Ella and Louis (1956)
 Billie Holiday – Songs for Distingué Lovers (1957)
 Red Garland – Red Garland at the Prelude (1959)
 Frank Sinatra — Ring-a-Ding-Ding! (1961)
 Judy Garland — Judy at Carnegie Hall (1961)
 George Benson – It's Uptown (1965)
 Sarah Vaughan – Live in Japan (1973)
 Lyn Collins – Check Me Out if You Don't Know Me By Now (1975)
 Wynton Marsalis – Marsalis Standard Time, Volume 1 (1987)
 Tony Bennett – MTV Unplugged (1994)
 David Bowie – Red Hot + Rhapsody: The Gershwin Groove (1998)
 Michael Bublé – It's Time (2005)
 Willie Nelson – My Way (2018)

See also 
List of 1930s jazz standards

References

Songs about weather
1930s jazz standards
1937 songs
Ella Fitzgerald songs
Fred Astaire songs
Jazz compositions in F major
Judy Garland songs
Pop standards
Songs about London
Songs with lyrics by Ira Gershwin
Songs with music by George Gershwin
Songs written for films